The Myanmar Ambassador in London is the official representative of the Government in Naypyidaw to the Governments of the United Kingdom and Sweden.

The current Myanmar Ambassador to the U.K. is Kyaw Zwar Minn.

Although, the Burmese military claims that his position as Ambassador has been terminated, Burma's Foreign Affairs ministry indicated that he has not been recalled as Ambassador to the U.K.

History
Since 1989 Union of Myanmar

List of representatives

References 

 
United Kingdom
Myanmar